Gopaldev (1540–1611) was an Indian poet, dramatist and chief preacher of the Vaishnava sect in eastern Assam. He was belonged from Bhabanipur, Assam so people called him as Bhabanipuria Gopal Ata. He is also a disciple of Mahapurush Shrimanta Sankardev.

Brief life
Gopaldev was born in 1540 at Nazira in Sivasagar district of Assam to father Kameswar and mother Bajrangi. Their family later shifted to Bhabanipur in Kamrup. He did his early education there under a Brahmin scholar. Gopaldev had a son Kamaleswardev and daughter Padmapriya. Padmapriya was said to be the first female Assamese poet belonging to the 16th century.

Works
As a Vaishnavite guru of Ekasarana Dharma, Gopaldev founded the Kaljhar sattra, about 7 km from Pathsala in Barpeta district and  used it as his working place.

Literary works
Gopaldev composed some plays like Janmajatra, Nandutsav and Uddhabjan or Gopi-Uddhab Sambad and Sitar Patal Proves written in Early Assamese language.

Tithi
The birth anniversary of Gopaldev is celebrated in Namghars and Sattras of Assam as Tithi of Gopaldev (গোপালদেৱৰ তিথি). The Government of Assam declares this day as holiday in every year on this occasion.

See also
 Assamese literature
 List of Assamese writers with their pen names
 List of Assamese-language poets

References

External links

1541 births
1611 deaths
Ekasarana Dharma
Assamese-language poets
Assam dramatists and playwrights
People from Sivasagar district
Dramatists and playwrights from Assam
16th-century Indian dramatists and playwrights
17th-century Indian dramatists and playwrights